Medway Township is a township in Hamilton County, Kansas, USA.  As of the 2000 census, its population was 53.  It was previously known as Melvern Township.

Geography
Medway Township covers an area of 108.17 square miles (280.16 square kilometers); of this, 0.31 square miles (0.8 square kilometers) or 0.29 percent is water. The streams of East Bridge Creek and Plum Creek run through this township.

Unincorporated towns
 Medway
(This list is based on USGS data and may include former settlements.)

Adjacent townships
 Liberty Township (northeast)
 Richland Township (northeast)
 Syracuse Township (southeast)
 Bear Creek Township (south)
 Coolidge Township (west)

Major highways
 U.S. Route 50

Airports and landing strips
 Lewis Airport

References
 U.S. Board on Geographic Names (GNIS)
 United States Census Bureau cartographic boundary files

External links
 US-Counties.com
 City-Data.com

Townships in Hamilton County, Kansas
Townships in Kansas